Ha Seok-jin (born March 4, 1982) is a South Korean actor. He is best known for his roles in TV drama series: Radiant Office (2017), Drinking Solo (2016), Shark (2013) and 4 Legendary Witches (2014), for which he received two nominations for the Excellence Award.

Early life 
Ha Seok-jin was born in Seoul in 1982. Ha Seok-jin, the eldest of one son and one daughter, entered the Department of Mechanical Engineering at Hanyang University after graduating from middle and high school, and after completing his first year, he enlisted in the military.

Career 
When he returned to school after he was discharged, a friend who was attending another school got a job at an entertainment production, and Ha Seok-jin was offered to apply for recruiting new actors. At first he refused because of his studies, but he dreamed of a new challenge in his boring daily life, and thus made his debut in the entertainment industry through an advertisement for Korean Air in 2005. Initially, he didn't intend to continue pursuing his acting career, but is said to have gradually grown attracted to it and found it to be fun.

Besides of acting,he also got involve in several Variety Shows as cast member and guest including Problematic Men,Fox's Butler,I Live Alone,Escape Season 2,After The Show Ends,Amazing Saturday,Boss In The Mirror,Entertainment Weekly,Chef & My Fridge,Running Man,Sixth Sense Season 2 and Happy Together.

Personal life 
He made his entertainment debut in 2005 as a commercial model for Korean Air.

In April 2019, Ha signed with new agency C-JeS Entertainment.

In 2021, his contract with C-JeS Entertainment expired and was looking for a new agency to sign with. In July 2021, Ha signed a contract with Management Koo after his contract with the former agency expired.

Filmography

Television series

Web series

Film

Variety show

Web shows

Music video

Awards and nominations

References

External links 
 
 
 

1982 births
Living people
MBK Entertainment artists
South Korean male film actors
South Korean male television actors
Hanyang University alumni
Male actors from Seoul
21st-century South Korean male actors